was an Imperial Japanese Army officer who was a conspirator in the February 26 Incident in 1936 and was subsequently arrested and executed by the Japanese authorities for the attempted coup.

See also 
Showa Restoration

References

1903 births
1937 deaths
Imperial Japanese Army officers
People from Asahikawa
People executed by Japan by firing squad
Executed military personnel
Japanese rebels
Shōwa Restoration